Kiss of the Vampire (also known as Kiss of Evil on American television) is a 1963 British vampire film made by the film studio Hammer Film Productions. The film was directed by Don Sharp and was written by producer Anthony Hinds, credited under his writing pseudonym John Elder.

It was Sharp's first movie for Hammer. He went on to make several more films for the company.

Plot
Gerald and Marianne Harcourt are a couple honeymooning in early 20th-century Bavaria when their car runs out of petrol. They stop in a small village and opt to stay at the local inn until a cart arrives with more petrol. They accept a dinner invitation from Dr. Ravna, who introduces them to his children Carl and Sabena.

At a costume ball at Ravna's chateau, Gerald and Marianne are separated from each other. Donning a mask identical to Gerald's in order to impersonate him, Carl silently leads Marianne to an upstairs bedroom, where Dr. Ravna, a vampire, bites her. Gerald becomes concerned about Marianne's whereabouts, but Sabena gives him a drugged drink which renders him unconscious. Ravna is the leader of a vampire cult which intends to induct Marianne as a member.

When Gerald awakes, Carl insists that he was travelling alone and that Marianne was never in the chateau. The innkeeper, Bruno, supports Carl's story, and the police say that Dr. Ravna's standing in the community is too respected to investigate his chateau. Only the hard-drinking savant Professor Zimmer, who lost his daughter to the cult, acknowledges Marianne's existence and agrees to help. He advises Gerald that the cult will not be able to complete Marianne's transformation into a vampire until the following night, and prepares an arcane ritual using the Seal of Solomon that he can use to destroy the vampires once Marianne is freed.

Gerald knocks at the chateau's front door and knocks out the guard when he answers. He breaks into Sabena's bedroom and enlists her help in finding Marianne, but she betrays him to Ravna. Ravna has Gerald tied up and demonstrates to him that they have already brainwashed Marianne into embracing the cult and renouncing her love for Gerald. As Sabena scratches Gerald's chest as foreplay to a vampiric bite, he surreptitiously slips his bonds, then uses blood from the scratch to draw a cross on his chest. The vampires reel back from the cross, giving Gerald the opportunity to subdue Marianne and escape. The cult searches the grounds for them, but Zimmer provides a distraction which allows Gerald to topple a pillar on the guard.

Back at the inn, Zimmer says he knows Bruno only denied Marianne's existence for fear that the cult would harm his daughter, and compels him to bring the local priest to cure Marianne. As Zimmer works on the ritual, Gerald checks on Marianne and finds she has left, having been mystically summoned by the cult. The cult realizes that Zimmer will not destroy them so long as Marianne is with them. Gerald and the priest catch up to Marianne and tackle her to the ground. Zimmer's arcane ritual is completed, releasing a swarm of vampire bats which swarm over the vampires, draining them of their blood. As the vampires die, Marianne is freed of their spell.

Cast
 Clifford Evans as Professor Zimmer
 Noel Willman as Dr. Ravna
 Edward de Souza as Gerald Harcourt
 Jennifer Daniel as Marianne Harcourt
 Barry Warren as Carl Ravna
 Brian Oulton as 1st disciple
 Noel Howlett as Father Xavier  
 Jacquie Wallis as Sabena Ravna
 Peter Madden as Bruno
 Isobel Black as Tania
 Vera Cook as Anna
 John Harvey as Police sergeant
 Carl Esmond as Anton Stangher (TV movie only)
 Virginia Gregg as Rosa Stangher (TV movie only)
 Sheilah Wells as Theresa Stangher (TV movie only)

Background
Originally intended to be the third movie in Hammer's Dracula series (which began with 1958's Dracula with Christopher Lee and Peter Cushing, and was followed by 1960's The Brides of Dracula with Cushing alone), it was another attempt by Hammer to make a Dracula sequel without Christopher Lee. The final script by Anthony Hinds makes no reference to Dracula and expands on the directions taken in Brides by portraying vampirism as a social disease afflicting those who choose a decadent lifestyle.

The job of directing was offered to Don Sharp, who later said he had never seen a horror film before being asked to the job by Tony Hinds. Hinds told Sharp he thought the director would be ideal based on Sharp's other work. The director watched Curse of Frankenstein, Dracula and Stranglers from Bombay and became enthusiastic.

"What intrigued me about them was after about 20 minutes I was totally hooked despite a totally absurd situation," he said later. "I thought it was wonderful - here was a genre with its own ground rules and self contained world and you could be theatrical but treat it realistically to grab the audience and make them believe something absurd."

Sharp said he was worried that "as Hammer progressed, the goal seemed to be for each picture to top the one before it and they were becoming satiated with violence. So I persuaded Tony that it was better to suggest 'Is it going to happen?' and give the audience a little touch of it, and then go on and really get your big shock at the end. There could be a good size shock in the middle too but not all the time."

Sharp said "I've always believed there needs to be a separation between suspense and shock. You lead on a mood but if you introduce the shock moment too quickly then it's expected. If you hang on keeping the same mood and tempo as the rest of the sequence, and then shatter the mood with a sudden violent moment, that's when it really works."

The film went into production on 7 September 1962 at Bray Studios. It was not released until 1964.

Sharp enjoyed making the film and later said Tony Hinds was the best producer he ever worked with.

This is the only credited feature film screen role of Jacquie Wallis, who plays Sabena.

The film's climax, involving black magic and swarms of bats, was intended to be the ending of The Brides of Dracula, but the star of that film, Peter Cushing, objected that Van Helsing would never resort to black sorcery. However, the paperback novelization of Brides does use this ending.

Alternate version
Retitled Kiss of Evil for American TV, Universal trimmed so much of the original film for its initial television screening that more footage had to be shot to fill the missing time. Additional characters that didn't appear at all in the original release were added, creating a whole new subplot. Every scene that showed blood was edited out, e.g. the pre-credits scene in which blood gushes from the coffin of Zimmer's daughter after he plunges a shovel into it. Also, in the televised version it is never revealed what Marianne sees behind the curtain (Ravna lying on his bed with blood trickling from the corners of his mouth), a sight which makes her scream. A couple of the cuts result in scenes that no longer make sense: while the theatrical release had Harcourt smearing the blood on his chest into a cross-shaped pattern (keeping the vampires away as he escapes), the televised version omits the blood-smearing, leaving the vampires' inaction unexplained.

The additional footage shot for the televised version revolves around a family, the Stanghers, who argue about the influence of the vampiric Ravna clan but never interact with anybody else in the movie. The teenage daughter, Theresa, throws over her boyfriend in favor of Carl Ravna (unseen in these scenes) who has given her a music box which plays the same hypnotic tune that he plays on the piano elsewhere in the movie.

Critical reception
Howard Thompson of The New York Times wrote,"Until the picture floridly hops off the track toward the end, this horror exercise is a quietly stylish, ice-cold treat, beautifully tinted, well-directed (Don Sharp) and persuasively acted (Edward de Souza and Jennifer Daniel have the leads)." Variety wrote "Horror fans will dig this latest effort from the Hammer Film shop in Britain. It is a slickly-produced color story of evil doings in Bavaria, circa 1910, replete with suspense, demonism and mystery tightly wrapped in a skillful package of effective performance and well-paced direction." The Monthly Film Bulletin wrote "No new developments seem to have emerged in the vampire world, and this film is a straightforward and rather tame rehash of the standard formula...The direction is competent enough, though Don Sharp reveals no flair for this kind of thing, and there is a signal lack of atmosphere."

Home video release
In North America, the film was released on 6 September 2005 along with seven other Hammer horror films (The Brides of Dracula, Nightmare, The Evil of Frankenstein, The Curse of the Werewolf, Paranoiac, Night Creatures, The Phantom of the Opera) on the four-DVD set The Hammer Horror Series (ASIN: B0009X770O), which is part of MCA-Universal's Franchise Collection. This set was re-released on Blu-ray on 13 September 2016. In July 2020, Scream Factory released the film with a collector's edition Blu-ray that included both 1.85:1 and 1.66:1 aspect ratios as well as the TV version Kiss of Evil in standard definition.

Bibliography

Notes

External links
 
 

1963 films
1963 horror films
1960s English-language films
1960s historical horror films
British historical horror films
British vampire films
Films directed by Don Sharp
Films scored by James Bernard
Films set in the 1900s
Films set in Bavaria
Films set in Germany
Films shot at Bray Studios
Hammer Film Productions horror films
Universal Pictures films
1960s British films